Daniel Mellanby (born 17 August 1979) is an English former professional football striker who last played for Newton Aycliffe. He has previously played for Bishop Auckland and Darlington.

He played 44 league games scoring nine times in three years for the Quakers between the years of 2001–2004 he also played for the Bishops for a year between the year of 2000–2001. He now has jobs doing plumbing and steelworks. Whilst Bishop Auckland he was a member of Alan Oliver's Crook Town side which reached the FA Vase quarter-finals in 2006, Mellanby, who also served under Oliver at West Auckland, hit 15 goals in 50 Northern League appearances for the Newtonians.

In June 2012 he rejoined Darlington, however on 25 June 2012 his registration was changed to the new club Darlington 1883. in September 2012 he returned to Newton Aycliffe. On 12 January 2015, Mellanby was appointed manager of Northern League Div 2 Club Northallerton Town after being appointed assistant in Nov 2014.

References

External links

1979 births
Living people
Sportspeople from Bishop Auckland
Footballers from County Durham
English footballers
Association football forwards
Bishop Auckland F.C. players
Darlington F.C. players
Newton Aycliffe F.C. players
English Football League players